Gill Coliseum is a multi-purpose indoor arena in the northwest United States, located on the campus of Oregon State University in  Opened   the arena has a seating capacity of 9,604 and is home to the Oregon State Beavers' basketball, wrestling, volleyball, and gymnastics teams. It is named after Amory T. "Slats" Gill, the Beavers' basketball coach for 36 seasons (from 1928 to 1964), who compiled a  record.

The court is named for another OSU head coach, Ralph Miller, who led the basketball program from 1971 to 1989. The building also houses a weight room, equipment center, locker rooms, and offices for the Oregon State University athletic department and its teams. Inside, on the south wall of Gill Coliseum is a painted mural of many former players, including Gary Payton, Brent Barry, AC Green, Lester Conner, and Steve Johnson.

History
Prior to the construction of Gill Coliseum, intercollegiate basketball games were hosted in the Oregon Agricultural College Gymnasium, constructed in 1914. which continues to stand as the current 

Gill Coliseum opened in December  and housed the Horner Museum in the basement until the museum's closure

NCAA tournament
Gill Coliseum has hosted Western region games in the NCAA tournament 11 times (1952, 1953, 1954, 1955, 1956, 1957, 1960, 1962, 1964, 1967, 1983). The most recent in 1983 was the West sub-regional of the 52-team tournament. It included eventual champion North Carolina State; in their opener on Friday night, the sixth-seeded Wolfpack (20–10) was down six points to #11 Pepperdine with less than a minute to go in the first overtime, then rallied and won in double overtime. It was the late game and finished

Other features
The facility has a sports medicine center, located on the lower level of the coliseum, that provides injury prevention and rehabilitation services. The center includes cardiovascular equipment and improved training facilities. Part of a  renovation of the arena in 2009 included making Gill compliant with the Americans with Disabilities Act. The renovation also included sandblasting the exterior and applying new paint. New windows were installed on the east and west sides of the coliseum. The court has gone numerous remodels as Oregon State has updated their branding. Prior to the 2013–14 season, the court was updated to reflect the athletic department's re-branding along with some graphics surrounding the lower seating.

Construction of the Sports Performance Center (SPC) began in early 2007, and work was completed in spring 2008. The building is located between Gill Coliseum and the Tommy Prothro Football 
Complex. The SPC houses a practice facility for wrestling and offices for the weight training staff.  The  building is the home to over $500,000 in training equipment and a   sprint track. The four-story facility includes two full-size regulation courts and basketball offices which opened

Gallery

See also
 List of NCAA Division I basketball arenas
 Chiles Center
 McArthur Court
 Veterans Memorial Coliseum (Portland, Oregon)

References

External links

 Gill Coliseum (Oregon State Athletics official website)

Basketball venues in Oregon
College basketball venues in the United States
College gymnastics venues in the United States
College volleyball venues in the United States
College wrestling venues in the United States
Indoor arenas in Oregon
Oregon State Beavers basketball
Oregon State Beavers women's gymnastics venues
Oregon State Beavers volleyball
Oregon State Beavers wrestling
Oregon State University buildings
Tourist attractions in Benton County, Oregon
Sports venues completed in 1949
1949 establishments in Oregon